Greenideoida ceyloniae, also known as Greenideoida (Greenideoida) ceyloniae, is an aphid in the superfamily Aphidoidea in the order Hemiptera. It is a true bug and sucks sap from plants.

References 

 http://animaldiversity.org/accounts/Greenideoida_ceyloniae/classification/
 http://www.nbair.res.in/Aphids/Greenideoida-ceyloniae.php
 http://aphid.speciesfile.org/Common/basic/Taxa.aspx?TaxonNameID=1162368
 https://www.gbif.org/species/2077376/

Greenideinae
Agricultural pest insects